A lazy river is a water ride found in water parks, hotels, resorts, and recreation centers, which usually consists of a shallow pool that flows similarly to a river.
There is generally a slow current, usually just enough to allow guests to gently ride along lying on rafts. The current is generated by means of a gradual slope in the terrain, aided by a pumping mechanism that allows for the river to continue flowing infinitely. There may also be scenic elements added, such as small waterfalls on the edge of the river. Some connect or lead into swimming pools or wave pools, while others are self-contained courses that simply complete a circuit.

A torrent river, or wave river, is a related concept.  Torrent rivers feature wave machines similar to those that are in wave pools; the waves then push riders (who are on rafts, as they are in a regular lazy river) around the river faster than they would be traveling in a regular lazy river.  Torrent rivers appear at all of the Schlitterbahn water parks and Aquaventure in Dubai and the Bahamas.

A current channel is another water feature found in aquatic facilities that uses moving water for enjoyment. Water flows similarly to a lazy river but because of the depth can be used for aquatic therapy and swimming or walking against the current.

References

External links 
 

Water rides